Bayreuth 3 is the twelfth studio album and the final chapter of the Bayreuth trilogy, released by Joachim Witt in 2006. A limited edition version was released, containing a remix of "Wo Versteckt Sich Gott?" by VNV Nation.

Track listing 

 Dämmerung (Intro)  "Twilight"  - 2:08
 Ahhh!!! - 3:51
 Menschen  "Humans"  - 4:42
 Wem Gehort Das Sternenlicht?  "Who Owns the Starlight?"  - 5:49
 Schmutz  "Dirt"  - 4:00
 Wo Versteckt Sich Gott?  "Where Is God Hiding?"  - 4:01
 Abendrot (feat. Tilo Wolff) "Afterglow"  - 6:22
 Neuland  "Newland"  - 4:22
 Hundert Leiber  "Hundreds of Bodies"  - 3:52
 Leben Im Staub  "Living in Dust"  - 4:38
 Die Macht  "The Power"  - 4:11
 Tiefenrausch  "Downrushing"  - 4:20
 Der Turm (Edel Weisspiraten)  "The Tower (Noble White Pirates)"  - 4:05
 Ich Spreng Den Tag!  "I Blast The Day!"  - 4:04
 Tief In Der Tiefe  "Deep in the Depth"  - 4:57
 Wo Versteckt Sich Gott? (VNV Nation Remix)  "Where Is God Hiding?"  - 4:16

2006 albums
Joachim Witt albums